Yin (印) is a Chinese surname meaning "stamp" or "seal".<ref>The Oxford Dictionary of Family Names in Britain and Ireland'%20(%E5%8D%B0%20surname&f=false</ref> According to a 2013  study, it was the 355th most common name in China; it was shared by 121,000 people, or 0.0091% of the population, with the province with the most people being Jiangsu. It is the 265th name in the Hundred Family Surnames'' poem.

Origins
The surname originates with Zi Yin (子印), the courtesy name of Lun, son of Duke Mu of Zheng (ruled 627–606 BC).

Notable people
Yin Shun (印順), monk
Yin Qing (印青), composer
Luna Yin (印子月), C-pop singer
Yin Yijun (印毅俊), canoeist

References

Individual Chinese surnames